Kenneth Darnell Bannister (born April 1, 1960) is a retired American professional basketball player, from Baltimore, Maryland. At 6' 9" tall he was a power forward-center.

College career
Bannister played college basketball at Trinidad State Junior College, Indiana State University, and Saint Augustine's College.

Professional career
Bannister was selected by the New York Knicks, in the 7th round (156th overall), of the 1984 NBA Draft. Bannister played in 5 NBA seasons. He played for the Knicks, from 1984 to 1986, and the Los Angeles Clippers, from 1988 to 1991. In his NBA career, Bannister played in 253 games, and scored a total of 1,501 points. His best season as a professional came during the 1985-86 NBA season, as a member of the Knicks, appearing in 70 games, and averaging 8.6 points per game.

During the 1986–87 season, he played in Israel, with Hapoel Holon.

Bannister served as player-coach for the Treasure Coast Tropics of the United States Basketball League (USBL) in 1996.

References

External links
Stats at basketball-reference.com
Spanish League Profile 

1960 births
Living people
American men's basketball players
Albany Patroons players
American expatriate basketball people in Argentina
American expatriate basketball people in Brazil
American expatriate basketball people in Canada
American expatriate basketball people in Spain
Atléticos de San Germán players
Baloncesto Fuenlabrada players
Basketball players from Baltimore
CB Zaragoza players
Centers (basketball)
Estudiantes de Olavarría basketball players
Franca Basquetebol Clube players
Hapoel Holon players
Indiana State Sycamores men's basketball players
Israeli Basketball Premier League players
Joventut Badalona players
Junior college men's basketball players in the United States
Liga ACB players
Los Angeles Clippers players
Mississippi Jets players
New York Knicks draft picks
New York Knicks players
Power forwards (basketball)
Quad City Thunder players
Rockford Lightning players
Saski Baskonia players
St. Augustine's Falcons men's basketball players
Wichita Falls Texans players
United States Basketball League players
United States Basketball League coaches